Peter Johann Nepomuk Geiger (11 January 1805 – 29 October 1880) was a Viennese artist.

Life
Born in Vienna, Geiger wanted originally to follow the family tradition and become a sculptor, but drawing and painting were his natural element. He illustrated Anton Ziegler's Vaterländischen Immortellen ("Immortals of the Native Land") of 1839–40. Until 1848, he carried out numerous illustrations of historical works and poetry, but also made oil paintings for the Austrian Royal Family.

Returning from a journey to the Orient with Prince Ferdinand Maximilian Joseph in 1850, he entered a particularly creative period. In 1853, he became Professor of the Viennese Academy of Art. For the Royal Family, he made many works including illustrations of Goethe, Friedrich Schiller, and William Shakespeare. He also illustrated oriental life.

His erotic drawings are particularly remembered, though it is unlikely that they were the typical work of a court painter.

Selected works

1839: Ziegler, Anton. Vaterländischen Immortellen aus dem Gebiete der österreichischen Geschichte. 4 vols. Wien, 1840, 1839.
1843: Magyar-és Erdélyország története rajzolatokban: Geschichte Ungarn's und Siebenbürgen's in Abbildungen ...; Geiger Péter N. János akadémiai képirótól; tervezte és magyar 's német nyelven magyarázta Wenzel Gusztáv. 10 vols. Wien, 1843
 Joseph von Bülow's Memorabilien aus der Europäischen Geschichte für anziehende Weltbegebenheiten, ausgezeichnete Grossthaten, Würdigung der Verdienste von berühmten Männern etc. Aus mehreren Jahrhunderten gesammelt. Mit insgesamt 96 getönten Federlithographien von Johann Nepomuk Geiger auf Tafeln. 2 vols. New York, 1860
1861: Historische Handzeichnungen; mit erklärendem Texte von Gustav Adolph Schimmer; mit neunzig Tafeln. Wien: Aus der kaiserlich-königlichen Hof- und Staatsdruckerei, 1861
 Die Schlacht bei Lützen (The battle of Lutzen)
 Kampf der Tiroler unter Andreas Hofer (The struggle of the Tyrolese under Andreas Hofer)

See also
List of Austrian artists and architects

Bibliography
Wiesboeck, Karl L. (1868) Peter J. N. Geiger's Werke; oder, Verzeichniss saemmtlicher Radirungen, lithographischen Feder- und Kreidezeichnungen .... Leipzig: Weigel

References

External links

19th-century Austrian painters
19th-century Austrian male artists
Austrian male painters
1805 births
1880 deaths
Austrian erotic artists
Academic staff of the Academy of Fine Arts Vienna